The Vows of the Heron (Voeux du héron) c.1346 is a satirical Flemish poem, which purported to explain the causes of the Hundred Years' War in terms of the goading into action by a Low Country exile of Edward III of England.

Background
Robert III of Artois, in exile in England, was a significant bone of contention between England and France, as well as a persistent agitator of Edward to take action against France.

Theme
The Vows presents Robert as offering Edward a heron at a royal banquet: "I believe I have caught the most cowardly bird...It is my intention to give the heron to the most cowardly one who lives or has ever lived: that is Edward Louis, disinherited of the noble land of France...because of his cowardice". The poem satirizes Robert as the cunning instigator of the war; and presents Edward as his naïve, blustering victim.

While almost certainly a fictional account, modern historians consider that the poem nonetheless reveals a kind of truth about the relations of the two men, and the approach to war.

Ethos
Johan Huizinga emphasised as typically late medieval in the poem, what he called “the spirit of barbarian crudeness that it reveals”, as well as the self-mockery found within its grimness.

One knight, Jean de Beaumont, is presented as claiming that:
“When we are in the tavern, drinking strong wine,/When the ladies pass and look at us….Nature urges us to have desiring hearts/...[But when] our enemies are approaching us,/Then we should wish to be in a cellar so large”.

See also

Further reading
J. L. Grigsby ed., The Vows of the Heron (1992)

References

External links
 Vows of the Heron

14th-century poems
Satirical works
War poetry
Hundred Years' War literature
Anonymous works